The Hardacre Theater is a historic building located in the central business district of Tipton, Iowa, United States.  The theater was originally built as an opera house and its construction was funded by the estate of Jacob Hardacre.  Hardacre was a member of a fraternal organization, the Independent Order of Odd Fellows (I.O.O.F.), and it was  stipulated that the building was to be used for their functions as well.  The theater was opened in 1914, and it was converted into a movie house in 1919.  There is seating for 264 on the main floor and an additional 132 seats in the balcony.  The present marquee was erected by the Iowa Neon Sign Company of Des Moines in 1948. The I.O.O.F. sold the theater to Louie and Virginia Cook in 1978.  It continued to serve as a movie theater, and it hosted its own film festival until it closed in August 2013.  The Hardacre Theater Preservation Association bought the theater in 2014.  They are renovating the theater to accommodate digital movie equipment, to return it to a live performing arts theater, and to provide space to host community events.  It was listed on the National Register of Historic Places in 2016.

References

Theatres completed in 1914
Tipton, Iowa
Renaissance Revival architecture in Iowa
National Register of Historic Places in Cedar County, Iowa
Theatres on the National Register of Historic Places in Iowa
1914 establishments in Iowa